Nicholas Bonfanti (born 28 March 2002) is an Italian professional footballer who plays as a forward for  club Modena.

Club career
Born in Seriate, Bonfanti joined to Inter Milan youth sector in 2017 from Virtus Bergramo.

On 14 July 2021, he left Inter and signed with Serie C club Modena. He made his professional debut on 12 September 2021 against Teramo.

International career
Bonfanti was a youth international for Italy U17 and Italy U18.

References

External links
 
 

2002 births
Living people
People from Seriate
Sportspeople from the Province of Bergamo
Footballers from Lombardy
Italian footballers
Association football forwards
Serie C players
Inter Milan players
Modena F.C. 2018 players
Italy youth international footballers